Rangan Style is a 2014 Indian Kannada-language romantic comedy drama film written and directed by Prashanth S starring Pradeep and Kanika Tiwari in the lead roles. This film also starring Sudeepa in an important guest role and also starring Rekha Das, Sadhu Kokila, Gurukiran, Sharath Lohitashwa, Tabla Nani and others. Film produced by Orange brothers under the banner Orange cinemas.

Cast

 Pradeep as Ranga
 Kanika Tiwari as Divya
 Sudeepa as Police Officer (Cameo)
 Bharti Singh (Cameo)
 Rekha Das
 Sadhu Kokila
 Sharath Lohitashwa
 Gurukiran 
 Tabla Nani

Soundtrack
Music composed by Gurukiran for all songs.
lyrics by Gurukiran, Kaviraj, Ravi, and others

Reception

Critical response 

Sify wrote "Music by Gurukiran is praise worthy and feels like Guru is back, while the dialogues penned by Manju Mandavya and cinematography by Cine Tech Soori are commendable". Y Maheswara Reddy of DNA scored the film at 3 out of 5 stars and wrote that "The stunt and chase sequences in the film are a drag. Also, some of the dialogues in the film come across as offensive. The film is worth a watch for the message it holds". A Sharadhaa of The New Indian Express wrote "Except for one peppy number, the songs composed by Gurukiran weigh the movie down. Prashanth has attempted to bring in a new twist to the same old love story but has ended up producing a rather boring flick".

References

External links
 

2014 films
2010s Kannada-language films
Indian romantic comedy-drama films
2014 romantic comedy-drama films
2010s masala films